Rodney Albert Seiling  (born November 14, 1944) is a Canadian former professional ice hockey defenceman. Rod is the brother of Ric Seiling.

Playing career
Signed by the Toronto Maple Leafs in 1962, Seiling played only one game with the Leafs and spent most of his time as a Toronto prospect in the minors. The next year, he represented Canada at the 1964 Winter Olympics, where they finished in fourth place. He was traded to the New York Rangers, where he would remain for the next decade, except for a brief claim by the St. Louis Blues in the 1967 NHL Expansion Draft, after which he was immediately traded back to the Rangers. His defensive abilities eventually helped guide the Rangers to the 1972 Stanley Cup Finals. He was a member of Team Canada in the 1972 Summit Series.

In 1974, he was claimed on waivers by the Washington Capitals, but after appearing in just one game with Washington he was traded to the Maple Leafs. Seiling also played for the Blues and Atlanta Flames before retiring at the end of the 1978–79 NHL season.

Post playing career
In 2006, Seiling was appointed Chair of the Ontario Racing Commission, where he served for 7 years.

In the 2009 book 100 Ranger Greats, the authors ranked Seiling at No. 41 all-time of the 901 New York Rangers who had played during the team's first 82 seasons.

Career statistics

Regular season and playoffs

International

References

External links

 http://www.ontarioracingcommission.ca/about.aspx?id=51

1944 births
Atlanta Flames players
Canadian ice hockey defencemen
Ice hockey people from Ontario
Living people
Minnesota Rangers players
Rochester Americans players
Baltimore Clippers players
New York Rangers players
St. Louis Blues players
Toronto Maple Leafs players
Toronto Marlboros players
Washington Capitals players
People from Woolwich, Ontario
Olympic ice hockey players of Canada
Ice hockey players at the 1964 Winter Olympics